Andrei Leonidovich Vasilevski (born July 21, 1966) is a Russian former professional ice hockey goaltender.

Between 1982 and 2001 Vasilevski played at the highest level of hockey in the Soviet Union and Russia. He was a long-time member of Salavat Yulaev Ufa which competed in the Russian Superleague.

Personal life
His son, Andrei Vasilevskiy (born 1994) who is also a goaltender, was selected 19th overall in the 2012 NHL Entry Draft by the Tampa Bay Lightning. He has since won the Stanley Cup twice, in 2020 and 2021, and won the Vezina Trophy.

References

External links

1966 births
Living people
Ice hockey people from Saint Petersburg
Rubin Tyumen players
Russian ice hockey goaltenders
Salavat Yulaev Ufa players
Severstal Cherepovets players